Neomoorea is a genus of orchids native to Panama, Ecuador and Colombia. It contains only one known species, Neomoorea wallisii.

References

Orchids of Panama
Orchids of South America
Monotypic Epidendroideae genera
Maxillariinae genera
Maxillariinae